Messaâd District is one of the districts of Djelfa Province, Algeria.

Municipalities
The district is further divided into 5 municipalities:

Messaâd
Deldoud
Selmana
Sed Rahal
Guettara

Districts of Djelfa Province